Carloff is a surname. Notable people known by this name include the following:

Surname
Boris Carloff, whose birthname was Milan Havrda (born 1974), Czech musician, composer and record producer
Hendrik Carloff (?? – after 1677), adventurer

See also

Karloff (name)